The 1996 Boston College Eagles football team represented Boston College in the 1996 NCAA Division I-A football season. The Eagles were led by third-year head coach Dan Henning, in his final year with the team, and played their home games at Alumni Stadium in Chestnut Hill, Massachusetts. They competed as members of the Big East Conference, finishing sixth with a conference record of 2–5.

Schedule

References

Boston College
Boston College Eagles football seasons
Boston College Eagles football
Boston College Eagles football